Etilda Gjonaj (born May 6, 1981) is an Albanian politician, lawyer, and professor. She served as Minister of Justice of Albania.

Early life 
Etilda Gjonaj was born Etilda Saliu in Pukë, Albania on 6 May 1981. In 2003, Gjonaj graduated from the Faculty of Law of the University of Tirana. She was admitted as an attorney the next year. In 2011, Gjonaj received a Master's degree in criminal science from the University of Tirana.

Gjonaj also lectured at the University of Tirana prior to taking public office.

Political career 
On 10 April 2014, the Parliament of Albania appointed Gjonaj to a three-year term as one of the three commissioners of the Office of the People's Advocate. She served in this role until April 2017, alongside Arben Shkembi and Ermir Kapedani.

On 22 May 2017, Gjonaj was appointed the Deputy Minister of Justice.

In August 2017, Prime Minister Edi Rama announced that he was appointing Gjonaj as the minister of justice.

Gjonaj is a member of the Socialist Party.

Personal life 
Gjonaj is married to Irvelin Gjonaj. They have one son.

References 

1981 births
Living people
21st-century Albanian women politicians
21st-century Albanian politicians
People from Pukë
University of Tirana alumni
Socialist Party of Albania politicians
Government ministers of Albania
Women government ministers of Albania
Justice ministers of Albania
Female justice ministers